Margaret Obank is a British publisher, noted for her contribution to the dissemination of contemporary Arabic literature in English translation.

Life
Obank was born in Leeds. She studied philosophy and literature at Leeds University and linguistics at Birkbeck College. She worked in teaching and in printing and publishing for many years. Along with her husband, the Iraqi author Samuel Shimon, Obank was the driving force behind the creation of Banipal magazine, a journal exclusively devoted to publishing English translations of modern Arabic literature. The first issue of Banipal was published in February 1998, and as of 2011, there have been 42 issues.

Obank has also established: 
 the Banipal Trust for Arab Literature (which administers the Banipal Prize for literary translation),
 the Banipal-Arab British Centre Library of Modern Arab Literature, and
 Banipal Books.

Obank is a trustee of the Arabic Booker Prize, and she is also involved with CASAW.

References

External links
 Interview with Margaret Obank

English publishers (people)
Alumni of the University of Leeds
Living people
Year of birth missing (living people)